The Makaleha Mountains (pronounced  or  in Hawaiian) are a mountain range in Kauai County on the eastern side of the Hawaiian island of Kauai.

The derivation of the place name Makaleha is the Hawaiian word makaleha (from maka "eye" and leha "to lift up") meaning "to wonder at; to admire" or "to lift the eyebrows, as in wonder or admiration".

Makaleha pritchardia or Pritchardia hardyi is an endangered species of Arecaceae palm tree that is endemic to Hawaiian tropical rainforests on Kauai. In 1998 only 30 individuals remained in the wild along Powerline Trail between Wailua and Princeville.

Footnotes

External links
 Google map
 Makaleha Mountains place names

Landforms of Kauai
Mountains of Hawaii